The Hunter 280 is an American sailboat that was designed by the Hunter Design Team in conjunction with Rob Mazza, as a cruising boat and first built in 1995.

The design replaced the Hunter 28 in the company line, which had been produced from 1989 to 1994.

Production
The design was built by Hunter Marine in the United States between 1995 and 1999, but it is now out of production.

Design
The Hunter 280 is a recreational keelboat, built predominantly of fiberglass. It has a fractional sloop B&R rig with a full-batten mainsail and 110% genoa, a raked stem, a walk-through reverse transom with a swimming platform, an internally-mounted spade-type rudder controlled by a wheel or an optional tiller and a fixed fin keel or option shoal-draft wing keel. It displaces  and carries  of ballast.

Standard factory equipment supplied included self-tailing winches, double lifelines, a teak and holly cabin sole, a dinette table that converts to a berth, four opening ports, an enclosed head with a  holding tank, shower, icebox, kitchen dishes, anchor, fog horn and life jackets. The boat has sleeping accommodation for six people. Optional equipment included a spinnaker and an LPG stove.

The design has a PHRF racing average handicap of 186 with a high of 192 and low of 180.

See also
List of sailing boat types

Similar sailboats
Aloha 28
Beneteau First 285
Cal 28
Catalina 28
Cumulus 28
Grampian 28
Hunter 28
J/28
O'Day 28
Pearson 28
Sabre 28
Sea Sprite 27
Sirius 28
Tanzer 28
TES 28 Magnam
Viking 28

References

External links
Official brochure

Keelboats
1990s sailboat type designs
Sailing yachts
Sailboat type designs by Hunter Design Team
Sailboat type designs by Rob Mazza
Sailboat types built by Hunter Marine